Eastern Army may refer to:

 Eastern Army (Japan), an active army of the Japan Ground Self-Defense Force
 Eastern Army (Ottoman Empire), active during the First Balkan War
 Eastern Army (United Kingdom), active during the Burma Campaign of the Second World War
 Eastern Army (Spain), active during the Spanish Civil War
 The forces of the Tokugawa shogunate during the Siege of Osaka